José "Pepe" Castaño Muñoz (born 14 February 1999) is a Spanish professional footballer who plays as a central defender for Greek Super League club Asteras Tripolis.

Club career
Born in Arcos de la Frontera, Cádiz, Andalusia, Castaño represented Xerez CD and Cádiz CF as a youth. On 17 May 2015, after already making his senior debut for the latter's reserves, he made his first team debut by starting in a 0–3 Segunda División B away loss against Arroyo CP; at the age of 16 years, 5 months and 7 days, he became the youngest player ever to debut for the club.

On 22 July 2015, Castaño moved to Villarreal CF and returned to youth football. He was promoted to the C-team the following year, and reached the B-side in 2018.

Castaño made his professional debut on 17 January 2019, playing the full 90 minutes in a 1–3 loss at RCD Espanyol, for the season's Copa del Rey. On 25 August of the following year, he moved abroad after agreeing to a deal with Super League Greece side Asteras Tripolis FC.

References

External links

Pepe Castaño at Cadistas1910 

1998 births
Living people
People from Sierra de Cádiz
Sportspeople from the Province of Cádiz
Spanish footballers
Footballers from Andalusia
Association football defenders
Segunda División B players
Tercera División players
Super League Greece players
Cádiz CF B players
Cádiz CF players
Villarreal CF C players
Villarreal CF B players
Villarreal CF players
Asteras Tripolis F.C. players
Spain youth international footballers
Spanish expatriate footballers
Expatriate footballers in Greece
Spanish expatriate sportspeople in Greece